"Rhodesians Never Die" is a Rhodesian patriotic song, written and first recorded by Rhodesian singer-songwriter Clem Tholet in 1973.  Though originally released as a pop song, its lyrics caused it to gain an iconic status amongst Rhodesians during the Rhodesian Bush War of the 1970s. This song has caused the phrase "Rhodesians never die" to become a popular patriotic phrase amongst former Rhodesians.

Notes and references

External links

Rhodesian patriotic songs
1973 songs